Events from the year 1907 in Russia.

Incumbents
 Monarch – Nicholas II 
 Chairman of the Council of Ministers – Pyotr Arkadyevich Stolypin

Events
Sovremennaya Rech, a liberal bourgeois daily newspaper publishes January to May, 1907.
Coup of June 1907

Births
January 21 - Jānis Mendriks, Latvian Catholic priest (d. 1953)
August 1 - Shmavon Mangasarov, Soviet artist of Armenian ethnicity
October 27 - Semyon Mandel, Soviet/Russian theatre and film production designer and art director (d. 1974)
December 7 - Fred Rose, Canadian politician and trade union organizer (d. 1983)

Full date missing

 Hans-Wilhelm Scheidt, German Reichsamtsleiter of the NSDAP, the German Nazi Party (d. 1981).

Deaths

 
 
 Dmitri Mendeleev, chemist and inventor  (b. 1834)
 Elizabeth Trubetskaya, courtier  (b. 1834)

References

1907 in Russia
Years of the 20th century in the Russian Empire